are a Japanese rock band. The band's name literally translates to The Dog-God Circus Troupe. Their visual element consists of the female singer wearing a kimono, and the rest of the band wearing military-style uniforms. They also wear Gothic and Kabuki style make-up.

History
In 2003 they busted out their major label debut on Zetima Records, "Inochi Mijikashi Koi Seyo Jinrui!"  Inugami Circus-dan covered X Japan's "Rusty Nail" for Crush! 3 - 90's V-Rock Best Hit Cover Love Songs-, which was released on June 27, 2012 and features current visual kei bands covering love songs by visual kei artists of the 90's.

Members
Inugami Kyouko - Vocals
Inugami Jouji II - Guitar
Inugami Zin - Bass
Inugami Akira - Drums

Discography

Albums
Jigoku no Komoriuta (地獄の子守唄) - 1999
Hebigami-hime (蛇神姫) - 2000
Ankoku Zankoku Gekijou (暗黒残酷劇場) - 2001
Kaidan! Kubitsuri no Mori (怪談 首つりの森) - 2002
Kami no Inu (神の犬) - 2003
Greatest Hits (グレイテスト・ヒッツ) - 2004
Sukeban Rock (スケ番ロック) - 2005
Kejijou no Eros (形而上のエロス) - 2006
Kago no Tori, Tenkuu wo Shirazu (籠の鳥、天空を知らず) - Oct 7 2009
Setakamui (セタカムイ) - May 12, 2010
Viva! America - Oct 20, 2010
Osorezan - 2012
Seishonen no Tame no Inugami Nyumon - 2014
Tamatsubaki Hime (玉椿姫) - 2014
Koko Kara Nanika ga Hajimaru (ここから何かが始まる) - 2015
Ougonkyou (黄金郷) - 2016
Shinjuku Go Go (新宿ゴーゴー) - 2017
Tokyo 2060 (東京2060) - 2018

Mini-Albums
Goreizen (御霊前) - 1997
Akaneko (赤猫) - 2000
Machiwabita Hi ~ Keijijou no Eros Gaiden (待ちわびた日～形而上のエロス外伝) - 2006
Kyoko no Kyofu no Shinya Radio: Featuring Inugami Circus Dan (凶子の恐怖の深夜ラヂヲ: Featuring 犬神サーカス団) - 2007
Ju-ren (呪恋) - 2008
Yakouressha Gokuraku Yuki (夜行列車極楽行) - Nov 5 2008
Shinumade Rock - 2011
A Nightmare of the Uncertainly Principle - 2013

Singles
"Jinkou Ninshin Chuuzetsu" (人工妊娠中絶) - 2001
"Saigo no Idol" (最後のアイドル) (2-track CD+18-track DVD) - 2003
"Inochi Mijikashi Koiseyo Jinrui!" (命みぢかし恋せよ人類！) - 2003 (Oricon Ranking 78)
"Saisho no Tobira" (最初の扉) - 2004 (Oricon Ranking 59)
"Tsugou no Ii Onna / Honto ni Honto ni Gokurou-san" (都合のいい女・ほんとにほんとに御苦労さん) - 2004
"Hikari to Kage no Toccata" (光と影のトッカータ) - 2007.8
"Jigoku ni Ochita Kodomotachi" (地獄に堕ちた子供たち) - 2007.9
"Takaramono" (たからもの) - 2007.10
"BABYLONIA Koi Monogatari" (バビロニア恋物語) 2007.11
"Itsuka" (いつか) 2007.12
"Tsubasa" (翼) Apr 9, 2008
"Sweet" Oct 8 2008
"Koi wa Munekyun" (恋は胸きゅん) - April 8, 2009
"Sakura Chiru Naka" - 2011

DVD / VHS
Yoru ga Owacchimau Mae ni (夜が終っちまう前に) - 1998
Nozoki Karaku Kyouken Shibai (覘キ絡繰狂犬芝居) - 1998
Hakoiri Idou Circus ~Tent Sono Ichi~ (箱入り移動サアカス~テント其ノ壱~) - 2002
Yomi no Kuni (黄泉の国) - 2003
Sennou (洗脳) - 2003Chingonka ~Requiem~ (鎮魂歌～レクイエム～) - 2003Video Clip-Shuu - Seppuku (ビデオクリップ集・切腹) - 2004

Compilation / OtherAkai Hebi (赤い蛇) (Akai Hebi) - 2000Ijou no Utage (異形の宴) (Akaasa no Shoufu [赤痣の娼婦], Enamel wo Nurareta Apollinaire [エナメルを塗られたアポリネール]) - 2000Ijou no Utage (異形の宴) (DVD) (Enamel wo Nurareta Apollinaire [エナメルを塗られたアポリネール]) - 2000
Forever Young (フォーエバー・ヤング) (Takeda no Komoriuta) - 2001
365:TRIBUTE TO STALIN (STOP JAP) - 2001

References

External links
Official Website

Visual kei musical groups
Japanese hard rock musical groups